(born July 6, 1950) is a Japanese manga artist and a former member of Dynamic Productions. Born in  Hiroshima Prefecture, Japan on July 6, 1950, he served as an assistant to Go Nagai for some time, before making his professional debut in 1977 with Atsui Kuni Kara Kita Shojo for the summer vacation special issue 2 of the magazine Weekly Shonen Sunday of Shogakukan. His most representative works are Ojama Yurei-kun and Heroine-kun.

He is not to be confused with live-action/anime producer Susumu Yoshikawa who was born in 1935.

External links
Susumu Yoshikawa at Japanese Wikipedia
Ojama Yurei-kun at Japanese Wikipedia
Heroine-kun at Japanese Wikipedia
Latest news about Susumu Yoshikawa

Manga artists
1950 births
Living people